Karoti is a village in the municipality of Didymoteicho in the northern part of the Evros regional unit, Greece. Its population was 271 in 2011. It was annexed to Greece as a result of the 1919 Treaty of Neuilly.

Population

Notable people 
Chronis Aidonidis (born 1928), singer

See also
List of settlements in the Evros regional unit

References

Didymoteicho
Populated places in Evros (regional unit)